The 2009 Goody's Fast Pain Relief 500 was held on March 29, 2009 at Martinsville Speedway in Martinsville, Virginia. It was the sixth race of the 2009 NASCAR Sprint Cup Series season. The winner was Jimmie Johnson, who led 42 laps, followed by Denny Hamlin and Tony Stewart in second and third place.

There were no time trials because of rain during the previous days. A live audience of 63,000 attended the event, which lasted three hours and 27 minutes. Last-place finisher Todd Bodine quit on lap 3 due to engine problems. Robby Gordon, Joe Nemechek and Dave Blaney also failed to finish. 13% of the race was run under caution; the average green flag run lasted about 33 laps. Most of the incidents that brought out the yellow flag were crashes. Five drivers failed to qualify, including Sterling Marlin, Tony Raines and Dennis Setzer.

Jeff Gordon often battled Denny Hamlin and Clint Bowyer for the lead. Gordon finished fourth and Bower finished fifth.

Entry list

Qualifying 
Qualifying was rained out. By owner's points, Jeff Gordon would win the pole.

Starting lineup

Race recap

Race results

Timeline
 Start of race: Jeff Gordon had the pole position to start the race before losing it to Dave Blaney on lap 44
 Lap 3: Engine problems put Todd Bodine out of the race; making him the last-place finisher
 Lap 22: Caution due to David Stremme and Michael Waltrip's accident; green flag racing resumed on lap 26
 Lap 42: Mandatory competition caution handed out by NASCAR; ended on lap 47
 Lap 45: Scott Speed took over the lead from Dave Blaney before losing it to Jeff Gordon on lap 57
 Lap 49: A problem with Dave Blaney's rear gear knocked him out of the race
 Lap 57: Jeff Gordon took over the lead from Scott Speed before losing it to Jeremy Mayfield on lap 141
 Lap 71: Caution due to Kyle Busch and Scott Speed's accident; green flag racing resumed on lap 75
 Lap 90: Joe Nemechek had problems with his brakes; ending his day on the track
 Lap 92: Robby Gordon spun his tires on turn 2; causing a caution that lasted until lap 96
 Lap 140: Caution due to David Ragan and Robby Gordon's accident; green flag racing resumed on lap 143
 Lap 156: Denny Hamlin took over the lead from Jeff Gordon before losing it back to him on lap 343
 Lap 255: Caution due to Scott Speed's accident; green flag racing resumed on lap 264
 Lap 349: Engine problems ended Robby Gordon's race weekend prematurely
 Lap 353: Caution due to debris; green flag racing resumed on lap 358
 Lap 356: Denny Hamlin took over the lead from Bobby Labonte before losing it to Jimmie Johnson on lap 430
 Lap 368: Robby Gordon spun his tires on turn 4; causing a caution that lasted until Lap 371
 Lap 429: Caution due to Jeremy Mayfield's accident; green flag racing resumed on Lap 433
 Lap 430: Jimmie Johnson took over the lead from Denny Hamlin before losing it back to Denny Hamlin on lap 456
 Lap 448: Caution due to Aric Alimroa's accident; green flag racing resumed on Lap 455
 Lap 456: Denny Hamlin took over the lead from Jimmie Johnson before losing it back to Jimmie Johnson on lap 485
 Lap 468: Caution due to a 3-car accident; green flag racing resumed on Lap 471
 Lap 474: Caution due to a Bobby Labonte and Martin Truex, Jr's accident; green flag racing resumed on lap 477
 Lap 485: Jimmie Johnson took over the lead from Denny Hamlin
 Finish: Jimmie Johnson was officially declared the winner of the event.

Standings after the race

References

Goody's Fast Pain Relief 500
Goody's Fast Pain Relief 500
NASCAR races at Martinsville Speedway
Goody's Fast Pain Relief 500